Seventh Day Adventist Secondary School is a co-ed second cycle school in Bekwai in the Ashanti Region of Ghana.

Notable alumni
Kofi Koduah Sarpong - Ghanaian administrator and CEO of Ghana National Petroleum Corporation
Kwadwo Owusu Afriyie - Ghanaian lawyer and politician. CEO of Forestry Commission

References

Schools in Ghana
Secondary schools affiliated with the Seventh-day Adventist Church